SBS Radio may refer to:

 SBS Radio, an Australian radio network
 Seoul Broadcasting System, a South Korean radio network
 SBS Love FM
 SBS Power FM